James Bringhurst (7 December 1730- –27 February 1810) was an American builder and merchant.

He was born in Philadelphia to prominent Quaker parents John Bringhurst and Mary Claypoole. In his early career, James was a master carpenter and builder, and later was a successful merchant. He owned an estate in Grays Ferry inherited from his first wife’s father, and was active in The Carpenters' Company of Philadelphia, Philadelphia Hospital, and the Pennsylvania Society for Promoting the Abolition of Slavery. 

In 1774, he was elected as a member to the American Philosophical Society. He was a member of the building committee for Philosophical Hall in Philadelphia. His son Joseph, a doctor, later joined the APS. 

He married three times: Anna Pole, with whom he fathered Joseph Bringhurst, Sr.; Hannah Peters; and Ruth Barker. He was a resident of Rhode Island at the time of his death. He is buried there at the Friends Cemetery in Tiverton.

References

1730 births
1810 deaths
Members of the American Philosophical Society
Quakers from Pennsylvania